Ena Chadha is an Indo-Canadian human rights lawyer, investigator, author and educator, known for her equality rights litigation and adjudication. She was appointed as the interim Chief Commissioner of the Ontario Human Rights Commission (OHRC) on July 22, 2020. Chadha was the 2019 recipient of the Indo-Canada Chamber of Commerce's Female Professional of the Year Award. She was a co-reviewer of allegations of racism within the Peel District School Board, the second largest public school board in Canada, in 2019.

Biography 
Ena Chadha was born in New Delhi, India, and moved to Canada at 2 years of age. She first lived in the Regent Park area of Toronto, Ontario, and later settled in Brampton, Ontario, where she attended elementary and high school, graduating from North Park Secondary School in 1986. Chadha has a journalism degree from Ryerson University, a law degree from University of Saskatchewan, and a Masters of Law degree from Osgoode Hall Law School, York University.

Family 
Chadha's parents are Rajinder and Mohinder Chadha and she has a sister, Meena Chadha. After her mother's death, Chadha and her family established an entrance scholarship at the University of Saskatchewan for a first year female law student of indigenous background to honour her mother's legacy of community service and belief in supporting disadvantaged women.

Career 
Chadha was appointed as the interim Chief Commissioner of the Ontario Human Rights Commission on July 22, 2020. Her appointment came at a critical moment as the OHRC sought to address human rights issues emerging from the COVID-19 pandemic, while initiating a Right to Read public inquiry and a systemic racism inquiry into the Toronto Police Services.

Highlights of Chadha's career include being the chair of the board of directors of the Human Rights Legal Support Center (2018-2020), Director of Litigation of ARCH: Disability Law Centre (2000-2007) and her appointment as vice-chair at the Human Rights Tribunal of Ontario (2007-2015), where she was a mediator and adjudicator rendering important rulings in the areas of race discrimination and sexual harassment. Chadha has been recognized by the Canadian Bar Association as a "Leader of Change" for her work in challenging institutionalized inequality and racial barriers.

Publications 
Chadha has written extensively on the topic of human rights. Her articles have been published in the Supreme Court Law Review, National Journal of Constitutional Law and Journal of Law and Social Policy. She has contributed to equality rights books and co-wrote a chapter in a 2018 Oxford University Press treatise about international human rights law for women with disabilities and is a frequent public speaker promoting human rights.

List of articles

Book chapters

References 

Living people
Human rights lawyers
People from New Delhi
Toronto Metropolitan University alumni
University of Saskatchewan alumni
Osgoode Hall Law School alumni
Year of birth missing (living people)